Samaire Rhys Armstrong is an American actress and fashion designer. She is known for her roles in Stay Alive, The O.C., It's a Boy Girl Thing, and as Juliet Darling in the ABC television series, Dirty Sexy Money. She has appeared on television as Elaine Richards in the ABC fantasy-drama Resurrection. She has also appeared in music videos for "Penny & Me" by Hanson and "Bad Day" by Daniel Powter.

Early life
Armstrong was born in Tokyo to a Scottish father, Hunter Armstrong, and an Italian mother, Sylvia Sepielli. Her mother designs spas for resorts and her father teaches soldiers close combat training. Armstrong lived in Japan for five years, before moving to Hawaii and later Sedona, Arizona where she grew up and attended Sedona Red Rock High School. She has also lived in Malaysia and China.

Television career
In 2000, Armstrong made her television debut guest starring in an episode of the teen drama television series Party of Five portraying Meredith. Throughout 2000 to 2001, Armstrong made guest roles on high-profile television shows such as The X-Files, ER, Judging Amy and Freaks and Geeks.

In 2003, Armstrong was cast in the role of Anna Stern on the Fox teen drama television series, The O.C.. Armstrong was intended to only appear in one episode. However, after her character proved to be a fan favorite, she was brought back to appear in several more episodes. She portrays the role of a self-confessed comic book reader and a sarcastic socialite from Pittsburgh who is a recurring love interest for Seth Cohen. Despite the regular appearance of her character throughout the series first season, she was not promoted to series regular. In 2006, Armstrong was confirmed to return for the series third season for two episodes. She did not return to the series which was cancelled after its fourth season.

In 2004, Armstrong appeared on the HBO television series Entourage, as an assistant to Ari Gold and love interest for Eric Murphy. Critics noted many similarities to her character Anna Stern and Emily. She was praised for her performance. She appeared in only eight episodes of the series' first two seasons. She went on to guest star in the television series CSI: Miami and Living with Fran.

In 2007, Armstrong was cast in her first series regular role on the ABC drama/comedy television series, Dirty Sexy Money. She portrayed the role of Juliet Darling, a spoiled heiress who aspired to be a serious actress. The series was an instant success and premiered on September 26, 2007 to 10.44 million viewers. The series received mixed reviews from critics. Her character has been noted to have many similarities to real-life heiress Paris Hilton. In March 2008 Armstrong announced she would not return for the series second season as a series regular. The series did not maintain its success and slipped in ratings throughout its run dramatically. The series was cancelled on August 8, 2009.

In 2010, Armstrong guest appeared in the HBO television series How To Make It In America in the series first episode portraying the role of Jane.

In 2012, she appeared in 8 episodes of The Mentalist, as a prostitute turned confidential informant for the California Bureau of Investigation. Her character Summer shared a kiss with Tim Kang's character Kimball Cho in the episode "At First Blush" after Cho admitted having feelings for Summer.

In September 2013, she played the mother of the blond boy who perpetrated the school shooting in the Sons of Anarchy season six premiere "Straw".

Film career
Armstrong made her film debut portraying the role of Kara Fratelli, one of the conjoined twins in the parody film Not Another Teen Movie in 2001. Samaire has since appeared in notable small roles in films such as Would I Lie To You?, Gramercy Park and Trash. In 2006, Armstrong co-starred alongside Lindsay Lohan in the film Just My Luck portraying the role of Maggie, Lohan's character's best friend. The film was a box office bomb and was negatively received by critics.

In 2005, The O.C. producer McG offered the leading female protagonist role in the horror film Stay Alive. She portrays the role of Abigail, an aspiring photographer and love interest to Jon Foster's character. The film was released on June 29, 2006, and debuted at #3 at the U.S. box office. Despite a worldwide gross of just $27,105,095 it was considered a box office success compared to the film's modest $9 million budget. The film was negatively received by critics with her performance receiving mixed reviews.

Armstrong starred as Nell Bedworth in the Canadian comedy It's a Boy Girl Thing, which was released on December 26, 2006, and received positive reviews from critics. The film was considered a box office success, earning worldwide $7,385,434. Samaire's performance was praised by critics.

In 2007, Armstrong starred in a relatively small supporting role as Jenny in the horror film Rise: Blood Hunter alongside Lucy Liu. The film was a box office and critical failure. She also had a leading role portraying Caitlin Atwater in the Lifetime film The Staircase Murders. The film follows the real-life crimes of Michael Peterson who was convicted in 2003 of pushing his wife down the stairs. The film received mixed reviews.

In 2008, Armstrong starred the independent romance film Around June. The film follows a young woman who finds love with an illegal immigrant whose love changes her life. Filming took place in San Francisco, California, in 2008. The film played at the Santa Cruz Festival in 2009. Armstrong has since been cast in another independent film, a crime thriller The Last Harbor, which released in 2010. She also starred in another thriller, 5 Souls, in 2013.

Personal life
Armstrong entered an "outpatient facility" in October 2007 "to deal with some personal issues." She checked out after six weeks but returned and stayed for another three months.

In December 2012, Armstrong and her then-boyfriend Jason Christopher welcomed their first child, a boy. She lives in Sedona, Arizona where she went to school as a teen.  In 2022, she ran for and lost the Sedona mayoral election.

Armstrong is a conservative and voted for Donald Trump in the 2016 presidential election. In 2020, she was criticized after claiming that "BLM is a billion dollar domestic terrorist organization" on her Instagram.

Filmography

Film

Television

Music videos

References

External links

 
 
 YouTube: Samaire Armstrong
 Instagram: Samaire Armstrong
 AskMen.com: Samaire Armstrong

21st-century American actresses
Actresses from Arizona
Actresses from Tokyo
American film actresses
American people of Italian descent
American people of Scottish descent
American people of Welsh descent
American television actresses
American expatriates in Japan
Anti-black racism in the United States
Critics of Black Lives Matter
Living people
People from Sedona, Arizona
1980 births